Long intergenic non-protein coding RNA 327 is a protein that in humans is encoded by the LINC00327 gene.

References

Further reading